Sergio Hugo Sánchez Ballivián is a Bolivian diplomat and a former Ambassador of Bolivia to Russia.

References 

Bolivian diplomats
Year of birth missing (living people)
Living people
Ambassadors of Bolivia to Russia
Place of birth missing (living people)